Muhannad Al-Saad  (born January 16, 1989) is a Saudi football player who plays as a winger.

References

1989 births
Living people
Saudi Arabian footballers
Al-Shabab FC (Riyadh) players
Al-Qadsiah FC players
Al-Faisaly FC players
Al-Nahda Club (Saudi Arabia) players
Al-Diriyah Club players
Al-Muzahimiyyah Club players
Place of birth missing (living people)
Saudi First Division League players
Saudi Professional League players
Saudi Second Division players
Association football midfielders